The women's mass start race of the 2015–16 ISU Speed Skating World Cup 1, arranged in the Olympic Oval, in Calgary, Alberta, Canada, was held on 15 November 2015.

Kim Bo-reum of South Korea won the race, while Irene Schouten of the Netherlands came second, and Ivanie Blondin of Canada came third. Misaki Oshigiri of Japan won the Division B race.

Results
The race took place on Sunday, 15 November, in the afternoon session, with Division A scheduled at 15:07, and Division B scheduled at 18:27.

Division A

Division B

References

Women mass start
1